The 2018–19 PlusLiga was the 83rd season of the Polish Volleyball Championship, the 19th season as a professional league organized by the Polish Volleyball League SA under the supervision of the Polish Volleyball Federation.

Due to financial issues of Stocznia Szczecin, the players have not received their salaries since the beginning of the season and most of them decided to leave the club by terminating their contracts by mutual agreement in late November or early December. On 13 December 2018, Stocznia withdrew from the competition.

ZAKSA Kędzierzyn-Koźle won their 8th title of the Polish Champions.

Regular season

Ranking system:
 Points
 Number of victories
 Set ratio
 Setpoint ratio
 H2H results

1st round

2nd round

3rd round

4th round

5th round

6th round

7th round

8th round

9th round

10th round

11th round

12th round

13th round

14th round

15th round

16th round

17th round

18th round

19th round

20th round

21st round

22nd round

23rd round

24th round

25th round

26th round

Playoffs

Quarterfinals
(to 2 victories)

Quarterfinal A
Quarterfinal B

Semifinals
(to 2 victories)

Semifinal A

Semifinal B

Finals
(to 3 victories)

Placement matches

11th place
(to 2 victories)

9th place
(to 2 victories)

7th place
(to 2 victories)

5th place
(to 2 victories)

3rd place
(to 3 victories)

Final standings

Squads

See also
 2018–19 CEV Champions League
 2018–19 CEV Cup

References

External links
 Official website 

PlusLiga
Poland
Plusliga
Plusliga
Plusliga
Plusliga